DT Next is an Indian English-language daily newspaper owned by Daily Thanthi Group, headquartered in Chennai, Tamil Nadu. It was launched on 1 November 2015 in Chennai, with Ninan Thariyan as CEO. On 30 June 2021, Thariyan resigned, and the following day, Yagna Balaji, the editor and co-founder of the newspaper, took over as CEO. However, as of March 2022, Thariyan has resumed being CEO.

Content from DT Next has been cited by BBC News, News18, NDTV, and the Indian Express.

References 

2015 establishments in Tamil Nadu
Newspapers published in Chennai
Publications established in 2015